The Central Asian Internal Drainage Basin or Central Asian Inland Basin is the largest of 3 major hydrological basins that cover Mongolia (cf. Arctic Drainage Basin & Pacific Drainage Basin). It is an endorheic basin.

The basin also includes  much of the Western and Central Asia: the watersheds of the Great Lakes Depression, the Valley of Lakes, and the lowlands of the Gobi Desert. It is separated from the other two basins by the ridges of the Khangai Mountains and Khentii Mountains. The Khentii Mountains also separate Arcic and Pacific basins within Mongolia.

It is further subdivided into local drainage basins.

See also
List of drainage basins by area

References

Bodies of water of Mongolia
Landforms of Mongolia
Endorheic basins of Asia
Landforms of Central Asia